Seán Mag Fhloinn was an Irish scribe.

Mag Fhloinn was a native of Cummer, County Galway. His transcriptions included songs attributed to Antoine Ó Raifteiri, poems by Thomas Moore, and grammar.

References
Scríobhaithe Lámhscríbhinní Gaeilge I nGaillimh 1700-1900, William Mahon, in "Galway: History and Society", 1996

People from County Galway
Irish-language writers
Irish scribes
19th-century Irish people
20th-century Irish people
1915 deaths